Paropecoelus is a genus of trematodes in the family Opecoelidae.

Species
Paropecoelus bhabhai Gupta & Puri, 1986
Paropecoelus corneliae Rohner & Cribb, 2013
Paropecoelus dollfusi Ahmad, 1983
Paropecoelus elongatus (Ozaki, 1928) Pritchard, 1966
Paropecoelus filiformis Ahmad, 1978
Paropecoelus indicus Madhavi, 1975
Paropecoelus lanceolatus (Martin, 1960) Yamaguti, 1970
Paropecoelus leonae Rohner & Cribb, 2013
Paropecoelus manteri Ahmad, 1978
Paropecoelus overstreeti Ahmad, 1983
Paropecoelus palawanensis (Fischthal & Kuntz, 1964) Pritchard, 1966
Paropecoelus parupenei Yamaguti, 1970
Paropecoelus pritchardae Ahmad, 1983
Paropecoelus quadratus (Ozaki, 1928) Shimazu & Machida, 1985
Paropecoelus sacculatus Pritchard, 1966
Paropecoelus sciaeni Ahmad, 1983
Paropecoelus sogandaresi Pritchard, 1966
Paropecoelus thapari (Nagaty, 1954) Pritchard, 1966
Paropecoelus theraponi Gupta & Ahmad, 1976
Paropecoelus upenoidis (Nagaty, 1954) Pritchard, 1966

References

Opecoelidae
Plagiorchiida genera